Catena Arena is an indoor arena in Ängelholm, Sweden. It was inaugurated on 20 September 2008. Replacing the former Ängelholms ishall, the capacity is 6,310. It is the home for the Rögle BK ice hockey team.

History
The former Lindab Arena, until 2008 known as Ängelholms Ishall, was located on the same ground. It had a capacity of 4,600 and was built in 1983 after the old stadium Vegeholms Ishall burned to the ground in a fire in 1982 (built in 1963).

See also
List of indoor arenas in Sweden
List of indoor arenas in Nordic countries

References

External links

Pictures and facts (unofficial)

Indoor ice hockey venues in Sweden
Sport in Ängelholm
Sports venues completed in 2008
Rögle BK
2008 establishments in Sweden